The 1954 Akron Zips football team was an American football team that represented the University of Akron in the Ohio Athletic Conference (OAC) during the 1954 college football season. In its first season under head coach Joe McMullen, the team compiled a 3–5 record (3-4 against OAC opponents). John Cistone and Mario Rossi were the team captains. The team played its home games at the Rubber Bowl in Akron, Ohio.

Schedule

References

Akron
Akron Zips football seasons
Akron Zippers football